Lorne Campbell Currie (25 April 1871 – 20 June 1926) was a British sailor who represented his country at the 1900 Summer Olympics in Meulan, France. With crew John Gretton, Linton Hope and Algernon Maudslay. Currie, as helmsman, took first place in race of the .5 to 1 ton. He was born and died in Le Havre, France. His father, John Martin Currie, was a younger brother of Donald Currie, the ship owner, and acted as agent for the firm in Le Havre.

Further reading

References

External links

1871 births
1926 deaths
British male sailors (sport)
Sailors at the 1900 Summer Olympics – .5 to 1 ton
Sailors at the 1900 Summer Olympics – Open class
Olympic sailors of Great Britain
Olympic gold medallists for Great Britain
Medalists at the 1900 Summer Olympics
Olympic medalists in sailing
British people of French descent
Sportspeople from Le Havre